Uwe Sauer (born 23 February 1963) is a former German basketball player and coach. He competed in the men's tournament at the 1984 Summer Olympics.

References

External links
 

1963 births
Living people
German expatriate basketball people in the United States
German men's basketball players
Olympic basketball players of West Germany
Basketball players at the 1984 Summer Olympics
Santa Clara Broncos men's basketball players
Sportspeople from Karlsruhe
BSC Saturn Köln players
Ratiopharm Ulm coaches
Ratiopharm Ulm players
USC Heidelberg players